Chur (locally ;  ;  ;  ;  ; ;  or) is the capital and largest town of the Swiss canton of the Grisons and lies in the Grisonian Rhine Valley, where the Rhine turns towards the north, in the northern part of the canton. The city, which is located on the right bank of the Rhine, is reputedly the oldest town of Switzerland.

The official language of Chur is German, but the main spoken language is the local variant of Alemannic, known as Grisonian German. Romansh and Italian are significantly spoken in the city as a result of the trilingual identity of the canton.

On 1 January 2020 the former municipality of Maladers merged into Chur and on 1 January 2021 Haldenstein also merged.

History

Archaeological evidence of settlement at the site, in the Eastern Alps, goes back as far as the Pfyn culture (3900-3500 BC), making Chur one of the oldest settlements in Switzerland. Remains and objects from the Bronze and Iron Ages have also been found in the eastern sector of the current city's centre. These include Bronze Age Urnfield and Laugen-Melaun settlements from 1300 to 800 BC and Iron Age settlements from the 5th to 3rd centuries BC.

The Roman Empire conquered the area that then came to be known as the Roman province of Raetia in 15 BC. Under emperor Diocletian (late 3rd century AD), the existing settlement of Curia Raetorum (later Chur) was made the capital of the newly established province of Raetia prima.

In the 4th century, Chur became the seat of the first Christian bishopric north of the Alps. Despite a legend assigning its foundation to an alleged Briton king, St. Lucius, the first known bishop is one Asinio in AD 451. The bishop soon acquired great temporal powers, especially after his dominions were made, in 831, dependent on the Empire alone.

After the invasion of the Ostrogoths, it may have been renamed Theodoricopolis;Sean D. W. Lafferty, Law and Society in the Age of Theoderic the Great : A Study of the Edictum Theoderici, Cambridge University Press, 2013, note 36.  in the 6th century it was conquered by the Franks. The city suffered several invasions, by the Magyars in 925–926, when the cathedral was destroyed, and by the Saracens (940 and 954), but afterwards it flourished thanks to its location, where the roads from several major Alpine transit routes come together and continue down the Rhine. The routes had been already used under the Romans but acquired greater importance under the Ottonian dynasty of the Holy Roman Empire. Emperor Otto I granted the town the right to collect tolls in 952 and appointed his vassal Hartpert as bishop of Chur in 958, giving the bishopric further privileges. In 1170 the bishop became a prince-bishop and kept total control over the road between Chur and Chiavenna.

In the 13th century, the town had some 1,300 inhabitants and was surrounded by a line of walls. In the 14th century, at least six fires damaged or destroyed the monasteries of St. Luzi and St. Nicolai, St. Martin's church and twice destroyed much of the town. The Gotteshausbund (League of the House of God) was formed in 1367 in Chur to resist the rising power of the Bishopric of Chur and the House of Habsburg. Chur was the chief town of the League and one of the places the Leagues' assemblies met regularly. A burgmeister (mayor) of Chur is first mentioned in 1413, The bishop's residence was attacked by the inhabitants in 1418 and 1422, when a series of concessions were wrung out of him.

On 27 April 1464, most of the town was destroyed in a fire, which only the bishop's estates and St. Luzi monastery survived. With the bishops' power waning as he came increasingly under the influence of the nearby Habsburg County of Tyrol, the citizens sent a delegation to Emperor Frederick III. The Emperor reconfirmed the historic rights of Chur and also granted them extensive new rights which freed the city from the bishop's power. In 1465 the citizens wrote a constitution which granted all governmental power to Chur's guilds. All government positions were restricted to guild members, allowing the guilds to regulate all aspects of life in Chur. Because guild membership was the only route to political power, local patricians and nobles quickly became guild members, often joining the winemakers guild.

The Chur lead League of the House of God allied with the Grey League and the League of the Ten Jurisdictions in 1471 to form the Three Leagues. In 1489 Chur obtained the right to have a tribunal of its own, but never had the title of Free Imperial City. In 1497–98, concerned about Habsburg expansion and with the Bishop of Chur quarrelling with Austria, the Three Leagues formed an alliance with the Swiss Confederation. In 1499 the Swabian War broke out between the Three Leagues and Austria and quickly expanded to include the Confederation. During the war, troops from Chur fought under the Bishop's Vogt Heinrich Ammann in the Lower Engadin, in Prättigau and near Balzers. Troops from Chur also took part in the 1512 invasion of the Valtellina and the Second Musso War in 1530–31.

In 1523 Johannes (Dorfmann) Comander was appointed parish priest of St. Martin's Church and began preaching the new faith of the Protestant Reformation. It spread rapidly and by 1525 the bishop had fled the city and Protestant services were taking place in the churches of St. Martin and St. Regula. The Ilanz articles of 1524 and 1526 allowed each resident of the Three Leagues to choose their religion, and sharply reduced the political and secular power of the Bishop of Chur and all monasteries in League territory. By 1527 all of Chur, except the bishop's estates, had adopted the Reformation. On 1 January 1529 Abbot Theodore Schlegel was publicly beheaded. Bishop Thomas Planta, a friend of St. Charles Borromeo, tried, but without success, to suppress Protestantism. He died, probably poisoned, 5 May 1565.

During the 16th century the German language started to prevail over Romansh. In 1479 about 300 houses and stalls burned in another fire. Nearly a century later on 23 July 1574, a fire destroyed 174 houses and 114 stalls, or about half the city. Two years later on 21 October 1576, another 53 houses were burned. Two years after the 1576 fire, the perpetrator, Hauptmann Stör, was executed.

After the Napoleonic Wars, the Three Leagues became the canton of Graubünden in 1803. The guild constitution of the city of Chur lasted until 1839, while in 1874 the Burgergemeinde was replaced by an Einwohnergemeinde. When Graubünden became a canton in 1803, Chur was chosen as its capital.

Geography and climate
Topography

Of this area, about 17.6% is used for agricultural purposes, while 52.1% is forested. Of the rest of the land, 26.5% is settled (buildings or roads) and 3.9% is unproductive land.

The water of Chur's spring is exported and sold as Passugger mineral water.

Climate
Chur has an oceanic climate in spite of its inland position. Between 1981 and 2010 Chur had an average of 104.6 days of rain per year and on average received  of precipitation. During this month there was precipitation for an average of 11.2 days.

Politics
Coat of arms
Blazon: Argent, a city gate gules with three merlons, within which a capricorn rampant sable, langued and viriled of the second.Administrative divisions

Government
The City Council (Stadtrat) constitutes the executive government of the City of Chur and operates as a collegiate authority. It is composed of only three councilors, each presiding over a department. In the mandate period 2021–2024 (Legislatur) the City Council is presided by Stadtpräsident Urs Marti. Departmental tasks, coordination measures and implementation of laws decreed by the Municipal Council (parliament) are carried by the City Council. The regular election of the City Council by any inhabitant valid to vote is held every four years. Any resident of Chur allowed to vote can be elected as a member of the City Council. The current mandate period is from 1 January 2021 to 31 December 2024. The delegates are elected by means of a system of Proporz. The mayor is elected as such by public election by means of a system of Majorz, while the heads of the other departments are assigned by the collegiate.

, Chur's City Council is made up of one representative of the FDP (FDP.The Liberals, who is also the mayor), one of the SP (Social Democratic Party), and one new member of The Centre (former CVP/PDC and BDP/PBD), giving the right parties a new majority of two out of three seats. The last regular election was held on 27 September 2020.

Parliament

The Municipal Council (Gemeinderat) holds legislative power. It is made up of only 21 members, with elections held every four years. The Municipal Council decrees regulations and by-laws that are executed by the City Council and the administration. The delegates are selected by means of a system of Proporz.

The sessions of the Municipal Council are public. Unlike members of the City Council, members of the Municipal Council are not politicians by profession, and they are paid a fee based on their attendance. Any resident of Chur allowed to vote can be elected as a member of the Municipal Council. The parliament holds its meetings in the Rathaus (Town Hall).

The last regular election of the Municipal Council was held on 27 September 2020 for the mandate period from January 2021 to December 2024. Currently the Municipal Council consist of 6 (-, no change) members of the Social Democratic Party (SP/PS), 4 (-) Swiss People's Party (SVP/UDC), 4 (+1) The Liberals (FDP/PLR), 3 (+1) The Centre (former CVP/PDC and BDP/PBD), 3 (+2) Green Liberal Party (GLP/PVL), 2 (-) Freie Liste & Grüne (Free List & Greens), while the Conservative Democratic Party (BDP/PBD) lost all their 3 seats due to Dissolution and merged with former CVP.

Elections
National Council
In the 2015 federal election the most popular party was the SVP/UDC with 26.43% of the vote followed almost equally by the SP/PS (25.96%), then the CVP/PDC (13.74%), the FDP/PLR (12.06%), the BDP/PBD (11.97), and the GLP/PVL (9.71). In the federal election, a total of 11,102 votes were cast, and the voter turnout was 45.4%.

International relations

Chur is twinned with:

 Bad Homburg vor der Höhe, Germany
 Cabourg, France
 Mayrhofen, Austria
 Mondorf-les-Bains, Luxembourg
 Terracina, Italy

Demographics
Population
In 2008, 17.8% of the population was made up of foreign nationals, by 2014 that number was 19.2%. Over the last 4 years (2010-2014) the population has changed at a rate of 2.34%. The birth rate in the municipality, in 2014, was 9.2, while the death rate was 10.0 per thousand residents. Most of the population speaks German (81.0%), with Italian being second most common (6.4%) and Romansh being third (5.3%).
 
, the gender distribution of the population was 47.9% male and 52.1% female. The age distribution, in Chur is; 3,087 children or 9.4% of the population are between 0 and 9 years old. 1,602 teenagers or 4.9% are 10 to 14, and 2,194 teenagers or 6.7% are 15 to 19. Of the adult population, 4,770 people or 14.5% of the population are between 20 and 29 years old. 5,517 people or 16.7% are 30 to 39, 4,616 people or 14.0% are 40 to 49, and 4,254 people or 12.9% are 50 to 59. The senior population distribution is 3,090 people or 9.4% of the population are between 60 and 69 years old, 2,314 people or 7.0% are 70 to 79, there are 1,307 people or 4.0% who are 80 to 89, there are 233 people or 0.7% who are 90 to 99, and 5 people who are 100 or more.

In 2015 there were 15,557 single residents, 13,722 people who were married or in a civil partnership, 1,948 widows or widowers, 3,423 divorced residents and 2 people who did not answer the question.

In 2014 there were 16,970 private households in Chur with an average household size of 2.00 persons. Of the 3,792 inhabited buildings in the municipality, in 2000, about 37.8% were single family homes and 39.7% were multiple family buildings. Additionally, about 20.5% of the buildings were built before 1919, while 8.8% were built between 1991 and 2000. In 2013 the rate of construction of new housing units per 1000 residents was 7.71. The vacancy rate for the municipality, was 0.6%.

Historic population
The historical population is given in the following chart:

 Language adds up to over 100% due to counting all languages, not just first language.

Religion
Of the rest of the population, there are 15 individuals (or about 0.05% of the population) who belong to the Christian Catholic Church of Switzerland, there are 589 individuals (or about 1.79% of the population) who belong to the Eastern Orthodox Church, and there are 532 individuals (or about 1.61% of the population) who belong to another Christian church. There are 13 individuals (or about 0.04% of the population) who are Jewish, and 917 (or about 2.78% of the population) who are Muslim. There are 424 individuals (or about 1.29% of the population) who belong to another church (not listed on the census), 1,998 (or about 6.06% of the population) belong to no church, are agnostic or atheist, and 1,589 individuals (or about 4.82% of the population) did not answer the question.

Education
In Chur about 70.3% of the population (between age 25 and 64) have completed either non-mandatory upper secondary education or additional higher education (either University or a Fachhochschule). The town is home to the Cantonal School of Graubünden.

Economy
, there were a total of 32,448 people employed in the municipality. Of these, 108 people worked in 26 businesses in the primary economic sector. A majority (68.5%) of the primary sector employees worked in very small businesses (less than ten employees). The remainder worked in 2 small businesses with a total of 34 employees. The secondary sector employed 3,645 workers in 345 separate businesses. A minority (21.2%) of the secondary sector employees worked in very small businesses. There were 75 small businesses with a total of 1,731 employees and 12 mid sized businesses with a total of 1,141 employees. Finally, the tertiary sector provided 28,695 jobs in 3,375 businesses. In 2014 a total of 16,854 employees worked in 3,306 small companies (less than 50 employees). There were 65 mid-sized businesses with 9,093 employees and 4 large businesses which employed 2,748 people (for an average size of 687).

In 2014 a total of 7.7% of the population received social assistance.

In 2015 local hotels had a total of 152,629 overnight stays, of which 47.8% were international visitors.

There were two movie theaters in the municipality, in 2015, with a total of 4 screens and 736 seats.

Crime
In 2014 the crime rate, of the over 200 crimes listed in the Swiss Criminal Code (running from murder, robbery and assault to accepting bribes and election fraud), in Chur was 68.6 per thousand residents, only slightly higher than the national average of 64.6 per thousand. During the same period, the rate of drug crimes was 15.7 per thousand residents, which is about one and half times the national rate. The rate of violations of immigration, visa and work permit laws was 2.4 per thousand residents, or about half the national rate.

Transportation

The city's main railway station is where the Swiss Federal Railways system link with that of the Rhaetian Railway (RhB). While the SBB lines serve most of Switzerland, most of Graubünden's internal rail traffic is served by RhB lines. One of the RhB lines (to Arosa) uses on-street running through streets in the centre of Chur and Sand in order to reach the station—see Chur Stadtbahn.

There are three other railway stations in Chur:

Chur Stadt (on the Chur-Arosa line)
Chur West
Chur Wiesental

There is also a postbus station situated above the railway station.

Chur is linked by a motorway—the A13.

Culture and tourism
Main sights

Chur is home to many buildings or other sites that are listed as Swiss heritage sites of national significance. There are two archeological sites in Chur, the old city which is a medieval city and Welschdörfli a prehistoric settlement and Roman Vicus. There are four archives or libraries; the bishop's palace (library and archive), the Cantonal Library, the Cantonal Archive of Graubünden and the city archive of Chur. There are also four museums on the list; the Bündner Kunstmuseum (Art Museum), Bündner Naturmuseum (Natural History Museum), the Dommuseum and the Rätisches Museum in the Haus Buol. Three churches are included in the list; The cathedral of the Assumption, the Catholic Church of St. Luzi and the Reformed church of St. Martin. There are 15 other buildings that are also heritage sites; these include the Alte Kaserne at Zeughaus 3 (the Old Armory), the Confederation Paper Mill, the Main Post Office, the new Town Hall, headquarters of the Rhätische Bahn and several old patrician houses. With the 2021 merger of Haldenstein into Chur, the Ruins of Haldenstein fortress and Haldenstein Castle became part of Chur.

Gallery

The first church on the cathedral site was built in the first half of the 5th century. The Romanesque crypt was probably built under Bishop Tello (758-73). It contains remarkable paintings by Albrecht Dürer and Hans Holbein. The current building was built between 1154 and 1270. In 1272 it was dedicated to Saint Mary of the Assumption. The round arch window along the center axis is the largest medieval window in Graubünden. The late-Gothic high altar was completed in 1492 by Jakob Russ.

The Church of St. Luzi was probably built in the 8th century, though the first record of it appears in 821 when the relics of St. Luzius were removed from the church. It may have been the site of a Carolingian scribes' school during the early middle ages. In 1149 it became the church of the Premonstratensian monastery.Official website-St. Luzi  accessed 27 December 2016.

The town is home to the Giger Bar designed by the Swiss artist H. R. Giger, the Old Town, the art gallery, and the natural history museum.

Sport
Chur's ice hockey team, EHC Chur, plays in the Swiss 1. Liga, the third tier of the Swiss ice hockey league system. They play their home games in the 6,500-seat Hallenstadion.

The American football team Calanda Broncos (formally the Landquart Broncos) moved to Chur in 2009, playing their home games at Ringstrasse Stadium. The Broncos currently play in the Nationalliga A and are the most successful Swiss American football team with the record for most Swiss Bowl wins (eight wins) as well as winning the EFAF Cup in 2010 and the Eurobowl in 2012. As of 2017 they finished first in the league, hosting Swiss Bowl XXXII in Ringstrasse Stadium where they defeated the Basel Gladiators 42–6 on 8 July.

The local football team are FC Chur 97 who play in the sixth division of Swiss football. They play home games at Ringstrasse.

List of notable people
 Early times 
 George Blaurock (–1529), Grisonian Catholic pater and leading personality of the Radical Reformation, one of the founders of Anabaptism
 Johannes Fabricius Montanus (1527–1577), German theologian and poet
 Jörg Jenatsch (1596–1639), Grisonian politician during Thirty Years' War, assassinated in Chur. 
 Soloman Sprecher von Bernegg (1697–1758), Habsburg field marshal in the Seven Years' War

 18th century 
 Jerome, 2nd Count de Salis (1709–1794), a Fellow of the Royal Society and sometime British Resident in the Grisons.
 Jeremiah Theus (1716–1746), Swiss-American painter, primarily of portraits.
 Angelica Kauffman RA (1741–1801), Austrian Neoclassical painter, successful career in London and Rome.
 Richard La Nicca (1794–1883 in Chur), a Swiss engineer, planned and implemented the Jura water correction project in the Swiss Jura

 19th century 
 Alexander Moritzi (1806–1850), a Swiss naturalist and early proponent of evolution
 Gottfried Ludwig Theobald (1810–1869 in Chur), a German-Swiss geologist and cartographer, taught in Chur 1854–1869. 
 Johann Baptista von Tscharner (1815–1879), born and died in Chur, lawyer and politician
 Philip Schaff (1819–1893), Protestant theologian and church historian, lived and taught in the United States
 Johann Coaz (1822– 1918), a forester, topographer and mountaineer from Graubünden
 Simeon Bavier (1825–1896), a politician, member of the Swiss Federal Council 1878-1883 
 Eduard Killias (1829–1891), a Swiss physician, naturalist and balneologist
 Carl Hilty (1833–1909), a philosopher, writer and worked as a lawyer in Chur for 20 years
 Adolfo Kind (1848–1907), a chemical engineer and one of the fathers of skiing in Italy
 Clara Ragaz (1874–1957) feminist, pacifist and supporter of the temperance movement
 Jakob Buchli (1876–1945), engineer in the field of locomotive design
 Alfred Heuß (1877–1934), German musicologist
 Josias Braun-Blanquet (1884–1980), a phytosociologist and botanist
 Rosa Gutknecht (1885–1959), a German-born Swiss theologian and cleric, in 1918 she was one of the first two women to graduate in theology and be ordained as pastors
 Harry Clarke (1889–1931 in Chur), an Irish stained-glass artist and book illustrator
 Kurt Huber (1893–1943), a university professor and resistance fighter with the anti-Nazi group White Rose
 Maurice Conradi (1896–1947 in Chur), a Russian White movement officer who fought in WWI and the Civil War in Russia

 20th century 
 Robert Platow (1900–1982 in Chur), German journalist, founder and publisher of the Platow Brief Heinrich Willi (1900–1971), pediatrician who co-discovered Prader–Willi syndrome
 Andreas Walser (1908–1930), a Swiss painter in Paris
 Gustav Guanella (1909–1982), a Swiss inventor, developed high-frequency electronics 
 Meinrad Schütter (1910–2006), a Swiss composer
 Rudolf Olgiati (1910–1995), local architect, of the New Objectivity movement
 H. R. Giger (1940–2014), visual artist, painter and Oscar winner
 Peter Zumthor (born 1943), an uncompromising and minimalist Swiss architect, works in Chur
 Alex P. Schmid (born 1943), a Swiss-born Dutch scholar in terrorism studies and former Officer-in-Charge of the Terrorism Prevention Branch of the United Nations
 Mario Illien (born 1946), engineer, specialising in motorsport engine design
 Robert Indermaur (born 1947), a Swiss painter and sculptor
 Hans Danuser (born 1953), a Swiss artist and photographer
 Corin Curschellas (born 1956), a Swiss singer-songwriter, vocalist, free improvisation, actress and voice actress
 Valerio Olgiati (born 1958), renowned architect of Grisonian buildings
 Raphael Zuber (born 1973), architect
 Adrian J. Meier (born 1976), politician of local council and explorer 
 Rebecca Indermaur (born ), a Swiss film and television actress

 Sport 
 Rico Bianchi (born 1930), a Swiss rower, competed in the 1952 and 1960 Summer Olympics
 Yvonne Rüegg (born 1938), a Swiss former alpine skier, gold medallist in giant slalom at the 1960 Winter Olympics
 Renato Tosio (born 1964), former ice hockey goaltender of EHC Chur
 Mario Frick (born 1974), a Swiss-born Liechtensteiner retired professional footballer who is currently a manager for FC Vaduz; 664 team games and 125 for his national team
 Giorgio Rocca (born 1975), an Italian former alpine skier 
 Thierry Paterlini (born 1975), a Swiss professional ice hockey defenceman
 Binia Feltscher (born 1978), Swiss curler, silver medallist at the 2006 Winter Olympics
 Nino Schurter (born 1986), mountain biker and Olympic gold medalist, lives in Chur
 Nino Niederreiter (born 1992), second highest NHL-drafted Swiss-born hockey player

Notes and references
Notes

References

Literature
 
 A. Eichhorn, Episcopatus Curiensis (St Blasien, 1797)
 W. von Juvalt, Forschungen fiber die Feudalzeit im Curischen Raetien, two parts (Zürich, 1871)
 C. Kind, Die Reformation in den Bistumern Chur und Como (Coire, 1858)
 Conradin von Moor, Geschichte von Curraetien (2 vols., Coire, 1870–1874)
 P. C. you Planta, Des alte Raetien (Berlin, 1872); Idem, Die Curraetischen Herrschaften in der Feudalzeit (Bern, 188i); Idem, Verfassungsgeschichte der Stadt Cur im Mittelalter (Coire, 1879); Idem, Geschichte von Graubünden'' (Bern, 1892).
 
 
 Principality of Liechtenstein homepage on religion

External links

 City of Chur – official website 
 Chur tourism office
 Chur on Graubünden Holidays, Switzerland; official Graubünden tourism office – English

 
Cantonal capitals of Switzerland
Cities in Switzerland
Cultural property of national significance in Graubünden
Municipalities of Graubünden
Populated places on the Rhine
Street running